Brazil: Cinema, Sex and the Generals (1985) is a British documentary directed by Simon Hartog that examines Brazilian filmmakers who used the pornochanchada genre (i.e. sex comedy) to escape censorship of their socially critical films during the military dictatorship in Brazil.

The documentary was scheduled for broadcast on Channel 4 but never aired.

See also 
 Beyond Citizen Kane, another documentary by Simon Hartog

References 

Documentary films about the film industry
1985 films
1985 documentary films
Cinema of Brazil
British documentary films
1980s English-language films
1980s British films
Pornochanchada